Otoyol 2, abbreviated as , locally referred to as 2. Çevreyolu, is a motorway in Istanbul, Turkey that forms the outer ring road of the city connecting European and Asian parts via the Fatih Sultan Mehmet Bridge.

It starts in Mahmutbey East on the European part, where the Avrupa Otoyolu  links, runs through the northern outskirts of the city passing over the Bosporus Strait, and terminates at the western end of the Anadolu Otoyolu , before the toll plaza is situated. Otoyol 2 is toll-free, however the Fatih Sultan Bridge is a toll bridge in the eastward direction only, having its toll plaza at the European side. O-2 is connected via three feeder highways to İstanbul 1. Çevreyolu (First Beltway)  and one highway to Avrupa Otoyolu (Europe Motorway).

See also
 List of highways in Turkey

References

External links

Istanbul road map

Transport in Istanbul Province
02
Eyüp
Kağıthane
Şişli
Beşiktaş
Transport in Kadıköy
Bağcılar
Esenler
Gaziosmanpaşa
Sarıyer
Beykoz
Ümraniye
Ataşehir